William Girsback, better known as Squire Gersh (May 13, 1913 in San Francisco - April 27, 1983) was an American jazz tubist and double-bassist.

Gersh played in San Francisco with Lu Watters, Bob Scobey, Turk Murphy, and Mutt Carey; he recorded with Watters in 1942 and with Murphy multiple times between 1950 and 1966. He accompanied Louis Armstrong on record and for a tour of South America between 1956–58, then played in Europe with Kid Ory and Red Allen in 1959.

References

Eugene Chadbourne, [ Squire Gersh] at Allmusic
"Squire Gersh". the New Grove Dictionary of Jazz.

Further reading
Leonard Feather, The Encyclopedia of Jazz.
J. Coggins, Turk Murphy:Just For the Record. San Francisco, 1982.

American jazz double-bassists
Male double-bassists
American jazz tubists
American male jazz musicians
1983 deaths
1913 births
20th-century double-bassists
20th-century American male musicians